Kaiseriola is a genus of bristle flies in the family Tachinidae.

Species
Kaiseriola aperta (Mesnil, 1970)
Kaiseriola obscura (Mesnil, 1970)

References

Exoristinae
Tachinidae genera
Diptera of Africa